WASP-4b is an extrasolar planet approximately 891 light-years away in the constellation of Phoenix.

Discovery
The planet was the discovered by the Wide Angle Search for Planets team using images taken with the SuperWASP-South projects eight wide-angle cameras located at the South African Astronomical Observatory. Analysis of over 4000 images taken between May and November 2006 resulted in the detection of a transit occurring every 1.3 days. Follow-up radial velocity observations using the Swiss 1.2-metre Leonhard Euler Telescope confirmed that the transiting object was a planet.

Characteristics
The equilibrium planetary temperature would be 1650 K, but measured temperature is higher at 1900 K. Dayside temperature measured in 2020 is 1957 K.

The study in 2012, utilizing a Rossiter–McLaughlin effect, have determined the planetary orbit is probably aligned with the equatorial plane of the star, misalignment equal to -1°.

The orbital period of the planet is decreasing by 7.33 milliseconds per year, with decay timescale of 15.77 million years. The anomalously high rate of orbital decay of WASP-4b is poorly understood as in 2021.

References

External links

 
 

Exoplanets discovered by WASP
Exoplanets discovered in 2007
Giant planets
Hot Jupiters
Transiting exoplanets
Phoenix (constellation)